The Passadumkeag River is a river in Maine.

East Branch 

West Branch 

See also
List of rivers of Maine

References

Maine Streamflow Data from the USGS
Maine Watershed Data From Environmental Protection Agency

Rivers of Hancock County, Maine
Rivers of Penobscot County, Maine
Tributaries of the Penobscot River
North Maine Woods
Rivers of Maine